Full Fathom Five is a 1990 action film, written by Bart Davis and directed by Carl Franklin, starring Michael Moriarty, Maria Rangel, and Diego Bertie. It was shot in Peru.

Plot
Full Fathom Five, based on the novel by Bart Davis, is set in the days preceding the United States invasion of Panama in 1989. , a fictional , rescues agents from Panama, and Peter MacKenzie (Michael Moriarty), the submarine's commanding officer, promptly falls in love with the beautiful Justine (Maria Rangel). Meanwhile, Panamanian rebels seize a Soviet submarine (the "Victor Three class submarine CCCP Kirov") and threaten America with a nuclear attack on Houston, Texas. Only MacKenzie and his crew can stop the villains.

Cast

 Michael Moriarty as McKenzie
 Todd Field as Johnson
 Michael Cavanaugh as Garvin
 Maria Rangel as Justine
 John Lafayette as Lasovic
 Orlando Sacha as Barrista
 Daniel Faraldo as Santillo
 Carl Franklin as Fletcher

References

External links
 
 

1990 films
American action films
Films directed by Carl Franklin
1990 action films
Cold War submarine films
1990s English-language films
1990s American films